is a Japanese professional footballer who plays as a winger for La Liga club Real Sociedad and the Japan national team.

Club career

Early career
At the age of seven, Takefusa Kubo started playing football for FC Persimmon, then moved to a local club based in his home city Kawasaki. In August 2009, he was awarded MVP at FC Barcelona Soccer Camp in which he participated at the age of eight. In April 2010, he was selected as a member of FC Barcelona School team and participated in Sodexo European Rusas Cup held in Belgium. He was awarded MVP even though his team finished third. After returning home, he began to play for the Kawasaki Frontale junior youth team.

Barcelona
In August 2011, Takefusa Kubo had been invited to join FC Barcelona's youth Academy, La Masia, after passing the trial. He began to play for Barca Aleví C (U11). During his first full season (2012–13), he was top goalscorer in the league with 74 goals in 30 games. In his third full season (2014–15), he was promoted to Barca Infantil A (U14). The Spanish club was later found to have violated FIFA's international transfer policy for under-18 youths, making Kubo ineligible to play for the club. He returned to Japan in March 2015 in search of playing time, signing with FC Tokyo’s junior youth team.

FC Tokyo
Takefusa Kubo joined FC Tokyo U-18 team in 2016. In September 2016, he was promoted to the senior side at the age of fifteen. On 5 November, he made his formal debut for the reserve team in the J3 League as a halftime sub for match against AC Nagano Parceiro. He made his professional debut at the J.League record of 15 years, five months and one day.

On 15 April 2017 Kubo became the youngest player to score in the J.League at 15 years, ten months in a 1–0 win over Cerezo Osaka U-23. On 3 May, he top-flight debuted for the first-team in J.League YBC Levain Cup playing 25 minutes in a 1–0 win against Hokkaido Consadole Sapporo.
In November 2017, FC Tokyo announced an update to Kubo's contract improving it to pay him as a first-team member.

Yokohama F. Marinos (loan)
On 16 August 2018, he joined Yokohama F. Marinos on a half-year loan. He immediately scored on his debut with Marinos in an away game against Vissel Kobe.

From the start of the 2019 season, Kubo became a regular starter for FC Tokyo in both the J.League YBC Levain Cup and J.League scoring goals in both competitions.

Real Madrid
On 14 June 2019, Kubo signed with Spanish club Real Madrid on a five-year deal. Although registered with their U-19 team, he had been expected to mainly play for Real Madrid B during the 2019–20 season. However, he featured regularly with the first team during Real Madrid's preseason tour of the United States and Germany.

Mallorca (loan)
On 22 August 2019, Kubo joined RCD Mallorca on a season-long loan. He has become the third Japanese player in Mallorca's history after Yoshito Okubo and Akihiro Ienaga. On 1 September, he made his La Liga debut playing 15 minutes in a 2–0 loss to Valencia. He became the youngest Japanese player in the Top 4 European leagues history that has played in a match with a record of 18 years, 2 months, and 28 days. He scored his first goal on 10 November 2019 against Villarreal in a 3–1 victory. He later scored his second goal in an entertaining 3–3 draw to Real Betis on 21 February 2020. He then scored his third goal two weeks later in a 2–1 victory over SD Eibar.

Villarreal (loan)
On 10 August 2020, he was loaned to Villarreal CF until the end of the 2020–21 season. After being mainly used as a substitute, his loan was cut short on 8 January 2021.

Getafe (loan)
Immediately after leaving Villarreal, Kubo moved to fellow top-tier side Getafe CF on loan for the remainder of the season.

Return to Mallorca (loan)
On 12 August 2021, Kubo rejoined RCD Mallorca on a season-long loan.

Real Sociedad 
On 19 July 2022, Kubo joined Real Sociedad on a permanent deal, becoming the first Japanese player to sign with the club. Kubo marked his debut by scoring the only goal in a 1–0 win away to Cádiz in their opening game of the season in La Liga.

International career
Kubo has been involved in Japan national teams from U-15 to senior level. At the age of fifteen, he was selected to the Japan U-20 national team for the 2017 FIFA U-20 World Cup.

Shortly before turning eighteen, Kubo was named in the squad for the 2019 Copa América, which marked his first call up to the senior squad. He made his debut on 9 June 2019 in a friendly against El Salvador, as a 67th-minute substitute for Takumi Minamino. In July 2021, he was included in the 22-player squad of the under-23 team for the 2020 Summer Olympics.

On 22 July 2021, Kubo scored Japan's first goal against South Africa in the 2020 Olympics.

Career statistics

Club

International

Scores and results list Japan's goal tally first, score column indicates score after each Kubo goal.

Honours
Individual
UEFA La Liga Revelation Team of the Year: 2019–20
Japan Pro-Footballers Association awards: Best XI (2022)

References

External links

Profile at the Real Sociedad website

2001 births
Living people
Association football people from Kanagawa Prefecture
Japanese footballers
Association football midfielders
Association football forwards
FC Barcelona players
FC Tokyo players
FC Tokyo U-23 players
Yokohama F. Marinos players
Real Madrid CF players
RCD Mallorca players
Villarreal CF players
Getafe CF footballers
Real Sociedad footballers
J1 League players
J3 League players
La Liga players
Japan youth international footballers
Japan international footballers
2019 Copa América players
2022 FIFA World Cup players
Japanese expatriate footballers
Japanese expatriate sportspeople in Spain
Expatriate footballers in Spain
Footballers at the 2020 Summer Olympics
Olympic footballers of Japan